"De Qué Sirve" is a ranchera-pop song by Mexican singer Paulina Rubio, released to digital retailers and streaming services on September 13, 2019 and was produced by Rubio. It was written by Rubio, Andrés Castro and Edgar Barrera. It was also her last single released as an independent artist before signing with Sony Music Mexico.

Rubio said, "I'm very passionate, and rancheras are very passionate. This is the kind of pop song that opened a lot of gates for my internationality back in the day and all my fans have been asking me to do a song like this."

Music video
The music video for "De Qué Sirve" was directed by Milcho.

Track listing 
Digital download
 "De Qué Sirve" – 2:35

Charts

References 

2019 singles
Paulina Rubio songs
Spanish-language songs
2019 songs
Songs written by Paulina Rubio